HMS H50 was a British H class submarine built by William Beardmore and Company, Dalmuir. She was laid down on 23 January 1918 and was commissioned on 3 February 1920. She had a complement of 22 crew members. HMS H50 was one of seven ships to survive to the end of World War II . She was sold for scrapping in July 1945 in Troon.

Design

H50 was fitted with an anti-aircraft gun and four  torpedo tubes. Its torpedo tubes were fitted to the bows and the submarine was loaded with eight  torpedoes. It is a Holland 602 type submarine but was designed to meet Royal Navy specifications. Its complement was 22 crew members.

See also
 List of submarines of the Second World War

References

Bibliography
 

 

British H-class submarines
Ships built on the River Clyde
1919 ships
World War II submarines of the United Kingdom
Royal Navy ship names